The Michigan Gaming Control and Revenue Act, passed by Michigan voters in 1996 as Proposal E and then expanded and signed into law as the Public Act 69 of 1997, allows non-Native American casino gaming in Michigan. The proposal was approved by 51.51% of the voters on November 5, 1996.

The text of the proposal as passed by voters:
An act providing for the licensing and control of casino gambling operations, manufacturers and distributors of gaming devices and gaming employees; providing for the distribution of revenue for public education, public safety and economic development; authorizing limited casino operations within the State of Michigan; and vesting authority for the regulation of casino gaming in a gaming control board.

Proposal E election results

Michigan Gaming Control and Revenue Act Overview
The Act (state statute) allowed casino gaming in qualified cities. The Michigan Gaming Control Board also started functioning as a state body responsible for registering casinos, licensing gambling vendors, registering casino employees, and managing patron complaints. The newly-formed state body is part of the Department of Treasury and Finance.

In November 1997, Detroit Mayor Dennis Archer selected and announced three proposed Detroit casino developers: MGM Grand, Greektown/Sault Ste. Marie Tribe of Chippewa Indians, and Atwater/Circus Circus.

Proposal E also enacted a new law that imposed an 18% State tax on gross gaming revenues. This state income is allocated to the City of Detroit and the School Aid Fund.

55% of the State tax revenue goes to the City of Detroit for various purposes, including anti-gang, youth, and impoverished neighborhood development programs; training and employing police officers; public safety programs (including fire department programs, emergency medical services, corrections, etc.); programs created to support local businesses; and other initiatives that improve the overall quality of life in the City of Detroit. The remaining 45% of the State tax revenue is reserved for the School Aid Fund (a Fund that supports the public school, community colleges, intermediate school district, and public universities of Michigan).

The Act also cut the net win tax paid by Indian casinos to the State or local governments since non-Indian casinos were allowed to operate in Michigan.

See also 
 List of casinos in Michigan
 Michigan Gaming Control Board

References 

1996 in Michigan
Initiatives in the United States
Michigan ballot proposals